Anthem +3 is an EP by American musician Father John Misty, released on July 2, 2020 on Sub Pop and Bella Union.  Co-produced by Josh Tillman and Jonathan Wilson, the release comprises four cover songs.

Two of the tracks, "Anthem" and "One of Us Cannot Be Wrong", are originally by Leonard Cohen, with the other two, "Fallin' Rain" and "Trouble", by Link Wray and Cat Stevens, respectively.

Track listing

References

2020 EPs
Josh Tillman albums
Bella Union EPs
Sub Pop EPs